Pultenaea canaliculata, commonly known as coast bush-pea, is a species of flowering plant in the family Fabaceae and is endemic to coastal areas of southern continental Australia. It is an rigid, spreading shrub with hairy, cylindrical leaves, and yellow and crimson flowers.

Description 
The flowers are borne in clusters near the ends of branchlets surrounded by and often partially hidden by the leaves. Flowering occurs from September to November and the fruit is an oval pod surrounded by the remains of the sepals.

Taxonomy and naming 
Pultenaea canaliculata was first formally described in 1855 by Ferdinand von Mueller in his book Definitions of rare or hitherto undescribed Australian plants from specimens collected "at Encounter Bay". The specific epithet (canaliculata) means "channelled".

Distribution and habitat 
Coast bush-pea grows on coastal dunes and limestone cliffs from Wilson's Promontory in Victoria, east to the Eyre Peninsula in South Australia, including on Kangaroo Island.

References 

canaliculata
Flora of South Australia
Flora of Victoria (Australia)
Taxa named by Ferdinand von Mueller
Plants described in 1855